Tankovo refers to the following places in Bulgaria:

 Tankovo, Burgas Province
 Tankovo, Haskovo Province